The Community College of Beaver County (also known as CCBC) is a community college located in Beaver County, Pennsylvania. The school includes approximately 3,600 credit students and over 3,200 non-credit students from in and around Beaver County.

History
CCBC was formed in 1966 and was originally located in Freedom, Pennsylvania. The college originally leased floors of the Freedom National Bank building and 17 vacant storefronts for classrooms and offices.

CCBC moved to Center Township, Beaver County where it created its own campus in 1971. In 1976, CCBC added a building called ‘The Golden Dome’ which is a geodesic recreational facility that houses the athletic department and showcases local community events. This building is the most recognizable symbol of CCBC.

In 1990, the school created an aviation building to house its acclaimed aviation program in Chippewa Township, Beaver County. The school built a new library in 1997 that also provides services to the Beaver County community.

External links
Official website

Beaver County
Beaver County, Community College of
Universities and colleges in Beaver County, Pennsylvania
1966 establishments in Pennsylvania
NJCAA athletics
Two-year colleges in the United States